Gloucester City is a city in Camden County, in the U.S. state of New Jersey. As of the 2020 United States census, the city's population was 11,484, an increase of 28 (+0.2%) from the 2010 census count of 11,456, which in turn reflected a decline of 28 (−0.2%) from the 11,484 counted in the 2000 census. It is located directly across the Delaware River from Philadelphia and the Port of Philadelphia.

Gloucester City was incorporated by an act of the New Jersey Legislature on February 25, 1868, from the remaining portions of Union Township, which was then dissolved. Additional territory was annexed in 1925 from Centre Township and in 1927 from Haddon Township. The city's name derives from Gloucester, England.

Gloucester City is known for its Irish American population, which was ninth-highest in the United States by percentage in the 2000 Census.

The city had the 23rd-highest property tax rate in New Jersey, with an equalized rate of 4.343% in 2020, compared to 3.470% in the county as a whole and a statewide average of 2.279%.

History

The name Fort Nassau was used by the Dutch in the 17th century for several fortifications, mostly trading stations, named for the House of Orange-Nassau. The one built in the 1620s at today's Gloucester City was for trade, mostly in beaver pelts, with the indigenous population of Susquehannock and Lenape. The region along the Delaware River and its bay was called the Zuyd Rivier and marked the southern flank of the province of New Netherland.

From 1638 to 1655 the area was part of New Sweden, which had been established by Peter Minuit, who had been Director of New Netherland, and was responsible for the famous purchase of the island of Manhattan. The location was disadvantageous since the richest fur-trapping area was on the west side of the river, where Swedish could intercept trade with the natives. In 1651, Peter Stuyvesant, director-general of New Netherland, dismantled the structure and relocated to a position on the other side of the river, in part to menace the Swedish, calling it Fort Casimir.

After the arrival of English Quakers on the Delaware, in 1677, a permanent settlement, at first called Axwamus, was established on the site of the present city. This was surveyed and laid out as a town in 1689. In 1868 it was chartered as a city.

Geography
According to the United States Census Bureau, the city had a total area of 2.76 square miles (7.15 km2), including 2.31 square miles (5.98 km2) of land and 0.45 square miles (1.17 km2) of water (16.41%).

Unincorporated communities, localities and place names located partially or completely within the city include Cloversdale, Gloucester Heights, Highland Park and Newbold.

The city borders the municipalities of Bellmawr, Brooklawn, Camden, Haddon Township, and Mount Ephraim. Gloucester City also borders Westville in Gloucester County and the city of Philadelphia in Pennsylvania, across the Delaware River.

Demographics

2010 census

The Census Bureau's 2006–2010 American Community Survey showed that (in 2010 inflation-adjusted dollars) median household income was $52,222 (with a margin of error of +/− $8,589) and the median family income was $58,825 (+/− $7,975). Males had a median income of $49,032 (+/− $3,038) versus $36,560 (+/− $2,335) for females. The per capita income for the city was $22,718 (+/− $1,341). About 12.2% of families and 14.2% of the population were below the poverty line, including 23.2% of those under age 18 and 8.8% of those age 65 or over.

2000 census
As of the 2000 United States census there were 11,484 people, 4,213 households, and 2,839 families residing in the city. The population density was 5,213.7 people per square mile (2,015.5/km2). There were 4,604 housing units at an average density of 2,090.2 per square mile (808.0/km2). The racial makeup of the city was 97.14% White, 0.69% African American, 0.18% Native American, 0.68% Asian, 0.03% Pacific Islander, 0.64% from other races, and 0.64% from two or more races. Hispanic or Latino of any race were 1.88% of the population.

As of the 2000 Census, 34.2% of Gloucester City residents were of Irish ancestry, the ninth-highest percentage of any municipality in the United States, and third-highest in New Jersey, among all places with more than 1,000 residents identifying their ancestry.

There were 4,213 households, out of which 32.6% had children under the age of 18 living with them, 46.8% were married couples living together, 14.6% had a female householder with no husband present, and 32.6% were non-families. 27.2% of all households were made up of individuals, and 13.0% had someone living alone who was 65 years of age or older. The average household size was 2.72 and the average family size was 3.32.

In the city the population was spread out, with 26.5% under the age of 18, 9.0% from 18 to 24, 29.2% from 25 to 44, 21.5% from 45 to 64, and 13.8% who were 65 years of age or older. The median age was 36 years. For every 100 females, there were 95.0 males. For every 100 females age 18 and over, there were 92.0 males.

The median income for a household in the city was $36,855, and the median income for a family was $46,038. Males had a median income of $35,659 versus $24,907 for females. The per capita income for the city was $16,912. About 7.7% of families and 10.1% of the population were below the poverty line, including 10.7% of those under age 18 and 11.5% of those age 65 or over.

Economy
Portions of the city are part of an Urban Enterprise Zone (UEZ), one of 32 zones covering 37 municipalities statewide. Gloucester City was selected in 2004 as one of two zones added to participate in the program. In addition to other benefits to encourage employment and investment within the Zone, shoppers can take advantage of a reduced 3.3125% sales tax rate (half of the % rate charged statewide) at eligible merchants. Established in August 2004, the city's Urban Enterprise Zone status expires in August 2024.

Sports
Gloucester Point Grounds is a former baseball stadium that was the part-time home to the Philadelphia Athletics from 1888 to 1890, with the Athletics playing games there on Sunday to avoid blue law restrictions in Philadelphia.

John L. Sullivan World Champion Boxer had an exhibition match with William Muldoon Greco-Roman Wrestling Champion in Gloucester in 1889.

Annie Oakley performed in Gloucester City on July 2, 1888 at the grandstand Gloucester Point Grounds along the Gloucester Beach in New Jersey as part of the Pawnee Bill Frontier Exhibition. Oakley would return to Gloucester City for exhibitions in 1898.

Government

Local government
Gloucester City is governed under the Special charter, which was originally granted in 1868 by the New Jersey Legislature. The city is one of 11 municipalities (of the 564) statewide that use a special form. The governing body is comprised of the Mayor and the six-member City Council. The Mayor is elected at-large and serves a four-year term. The six members of the council are elected in a three-year cycle with three elected at-large one year and one each from three wards to three-year terms the next year, so that there are no council seats up for vote in one year in the three-year cycle. The Mayor and Common Council are responsible for making public policy that addresses the needs of the City and its residents. The Mayor and Common Council also appoint members of the Planning and Zoning Board, as well as the Board of Health.

, the Mayor of Gloucester City is Democrat Dayl R. Baile, who was elected in November 2021 to serve the balance of the term of office expiring on December 31, 2022. Members of the City Council are Nancy Randolph Baus (D, 2024; Third Ward), George Berglund (D, 2024; First Ward), John Hutchinson (D, 2022; At Large), James "Bowie" Johnson (D, 2024; Second Ward), Robert J. Page (D, 2022; At Large, elected to serve an unexpired term) and Derek Timm (D, 2022; At Large, appointed to fill an unexpired term).

Mayor Dan Spencer stepped down from office in June 2021 from a term of office expiring in December 2022. In June 2021, the City Council appointed councilmember-at-large Patrick Keating to fill the mayoral seat on an interim basis. Based on the results of the November 2021 general election, Dayl Baile was sworn into mayor, having been elected to fill the seat that had been held by Dan Spencer, while Robert Page took office in the at-large council seat that had been held by Patrick Keating. In January 2022, the city council appointed Derek Timm to fill the at-large seat expiring in December 2022 that had been held by Dayl Baile before he took office as mayor.

Emergency services
Gloucester City is protected by a career fire staff 24/7 Located at 1 N. King Street. The fire department operates 1 Squad Company 51 (rescue engine), 1 Quint Company 51 (105' ladder), 1 Battalion 504, 1 Hazardous Material (Hazmat 5), 2 Engine Companies (52,54 volunteer stations), 2 Marine (boat) units and several support units.

The Emergency Medical Services (EMS) is operated by Virtua EMS formally Lourdes Health. Virtua EMS is operated daily with two NJ state certified EMTs and/or paramedics and serve as a Basic Life Support (BLS) unit. BLS 557 and 558 is located at 230 Nicholson Road at the Gloucester Heights Fire Association building.

Federal, state and county representation
Gloucester City is located in the 1st Congressional District and is part of New Jersey's 5th state legislative district.

 

The sheriff of Camden County had been Charles H. Billingham, a resident of Gloucester City who had previously served as the city's mayor.

Politics
As of March 2011, there were a total of 6,726 registered voters in Gloucester City, of which 3,320 (49.4%) were registered as Democrats, 660 (9.8%) were registered as Republicans and 2,744 (40.8%) were registered as Unaffiliated. There were 2 voters registered to other parties.

In the 2012 presidential election, Democrat Barack Obama received 65.6% of the vote (2,624 cast), ahead of Republican Mitt Romney with 32.6% (1,303 votes), and other candidates with 1.8% (72 votes), among the 4,058 ballots cast by the city's 7,177 registered voters (59 ballots were spoiled), for a turnout of 56.5%. In the 2008 presidential election, Democrat Barack Obama received 59.2% of the vote here (2,611 cast), ahead of Republican John McCain, who received around 37.0% (1,631 votes), with 4,411 ballots cast among the city's 6,711 registered voters, for a turnout of 65.7%. In the 2004 presidential election, Democrat John Kerry received 58.9% of the vote here (2,698 ballots cast), outpolling Republican George W. Bush, who received around 38.3% (1,755 votes), with 4,578 ballots cast among the city's 6,653 registered voters, for a turnout percentage of 68.8.

In the 2013 gubernatorial election, Republican Chris Christie received 59.0% of the vote (1,309 cast), ahead of Democrat Barbara Buono with 39.2% (870 votes), and other candidates with 1.8% (41 votes), among the 2,310 ballots cast by the city's 7,097 registered voters (90 ballots were spoiled), for a turnout of 32.5%. In the 2009 gubernatorial election, Democrat Jon Corzine received 54.8% of the vote here (1,473 ballots cast), ahead of both Republican Chris Christie with 36.0% (969 votes) and Independent Chris Daggett with 4.2% (113 votes), with 2,689 ballots cast among the city's 6,708 registered voters, yielding a 40.1% turnout.

Education
The Gloucester City Public Schools serve students in pre-kindergarten through twelfth grade. The district is one of 31 former Abbott districts statewide that were established pursuant to the decision by the New Jersey Supreme Court in Abbott v. Burke which are now referred to as "SDA Districts" based on the requirement for the state to cover all costs for school building and renovation projects in these districts under the supervision of the New Jersey Schools Development Authority. Students from Brooklawn attend the district's high school as part of a sending/receiving relationship with the Brooklawn Public School District.

As of the 2018–19 school year, the district, comprised of three schools, had an enrollment of 2,189 students and 173.5 classroom teachers (on an FTE basis), for a student–teacher ratio of 12.6:1. Schools in the district (with 2018–19 enrollment data from the National Center for Education Statistics) are 
Cold Springs Elementary School with 850 students in grades Pre-K–3, 
Gloucester City Middle School with 780 students in grades 4–8 and 
Gloucester City High School with 515 students in grades 9–12.

The Roman Catholic Diocese of Camden operates Gloucester Catholic High School, a co-educational Roman Catholic high school for grades 7-12 that opened in 1928. Saint Mary School was a Catholic grammar school that served grade levels from three- and four-year-old pre-school to eighth grade, which was closed by the diocese at the end of the 2010–2011 school year, in the wake of declining enrollment and rising deficits that were beyond the ability of the diocese to cover.

Transportation

Roads and highways

Interstate 76 is the main highway passing through Gloucester City. It enters Gloucester City from Philadelphia, skims the north side of the city, briefly enters Camden, then reenters Gloucester City as it turns south towards its eastern terminus at Interstate 295 beyond the city limits.

The Walt Whitman Bridge is the suspension bridge carrying Interstate 76 west over the Delaware River to Philadelphia. The bridge, which extends for almost  between abutments, opened to traffic on May 16, 1957. U.S. Route 130 also travels through Gloucester City.

Public transportation
NJ Transit bus service is available to Philadelphia on routes 401 (from Salem), 402 (from Pennsville), 408 (from Millville), 410 (from Bridgeton) and 412 (from Sewell), with local service on the 457 route between the Moorestown Mall and Camden.

The city is expected to be a stop on the Glassboro–Camden Line, a planned  diesel multiple unit (DMU) light rail system.

Notable people

People who were born in, residents of, or otherwise closely associated with Gloucester City include:

 James Barton (1890–1962), vaudevillian, stage performer and character actor in films and television
 Agnus Berenato (born 1956), former women's basketball program head coach at Rider University (1982–1985), Georgia Tech (1989–2003) and University of Pittsburgh (2012–2013)
 Jack Collins (born 1943), former Speaker of the New Jersey General Assembly
 Edward Durr (born 1963), politician and truck driver who represents the 3rd Legislative district in the New Jersey Senate
 Francis J. Gorman (1924–1987), politician who served seven terms in the New Jersey General Assembly
 Patrick T. Harker (born 1958), President of the University of Delaware (2007–2015)
 Eliza Leslie (1787–1858), author of popular cookbooks during the nineteenth century 
 Betsy Ross (1752–1836), best known as the creator of the flag that shares her name, the Betsy Ross Flag

Popular culture
 Gloucester City is cited by some as the birthplace of rock and roll. Bill Haley & His Comets—originally a country music band called "Bill Haley and the Saddlemen"—were the house band playing at the Twin Bar for 18 months starting in the early 1950s and are said to have modified their performing style while on stage there to an early form of rock and roll.
 In 1881, painter Thomas Eakins completed two versions of "Shad-Fishing at Gloucester on the Delaware River". A watercolor version is housed in the Metropolitan Museum of Art in New York City, while an oil on canvas version is on display at the Philadelphia Museum of Art in Philadelphia, just across the Delaware River from Gloucester City.
 On November 4, 1773, Elizabeth Griscom married John Ross at Huggs Tavern. Elizabeth is better known as Betsy Ross, a flag maker during the early days of the United States. Huggs Tavern was torn down in the 1920s; the former site of the tavern is part of what is now Proprietor's Park.
 Parts of the 1988 movie Clean and Sober—starring Michael Keaton—were shot in Gloucester City. The film prominently features the property at 215 Morris Street, which acts as the home of characters played by Kathy Baker and Luca Bercovici.

References

External links

 Gloucester City municipal information
 History of the Gloucester Race Track

 
1868 establishments in New Jersey
Cities in Camden County, New Jersey
Irish-American neighborhoods
New Jersey Urban Enterprise Zones
Populated places established in 1868
New Jersey populated places on the Delaware River
Special Charters in New Jersey